Lucas Dillon, 6th Viscount Dillon (died 1682) was an Irish peer who recovered title and lands after the restoration of King Charles II.

Birth and origins 
Lucas was born in Ireland as the eldest son of Theobald Dillon and his wife Sarah Bourke. His father was the third son of Christopher Dillon, who was the eldest son and heir apparent of Theobald Dillon, 1st Viscount Dillon. The Dillons are an Old English family, established in 1185 when Sir Henry Dillon came to Ireland with Prince John. Lucas's mother was an illegitimate daughter of David Bourke, who was a younger son of Theobald Bourke, 1st Viscount Mayo. Her family, the Mayo Bourkes, were Gaelicised Old English.

He heads the list of siblings below as the eldest:
Lucas (died 1682)
James, who was a captain in the army

His sisters were:
Honora, who married firstly Robert Dillon of Lisnagragh and secondly James Dillon of Rathmane
Bridget, who married a Dillon of County Mayo

Viscount 
Lucas's uncle Thomas Dillon, 4th Viscount Dillon, died in 1673 and was succeeded by his only surviving son, also called Thomas Dillon, Lucas's cousin. Thomas Dillon, the 5th Viscount died without surviving children a year later. Lucas succeeded him as the 6th Viscount Dillon in 1674. On 28 February 1675 he granted a yearly pension of £600 (about £ in ) to Elizabeth, the widow of the 5th Viscount.

Marriages 
Lord Dillon, as he was now, married firstly Ursula, daughter of William Dongan, 1st Earl of Limerick, by Maria Euphemia, daughter of Sir Richard Chambers, Baronet. Ursula died childless in 1680. In 1682 he married secondly Lady Anne Nugent, daughter of Richard Nugent, 2nd Earl of Westmeath.

Quit rent waiver 
On 22 September 1675 Lord Dillon obtained from King Charles II the waver of the quit rents to the amount of £455 13s. 10d (about £ in ) due to the Crown according to the Irish Act of Settlement of 1662.

Death, succession, and timeline 
A few months after his second marriage Lord Dillon suddenly died of dropsy in September or October 1682 at Kilfaughny, Westmeath, childless despite his two marriages. He was succeeded by Theobald as the 7th Viscount, a second cousin. His widow married secondly Sir William Talbot, 3rd Baronet and died after 14 July 1710.

Notes and references

Notes

Citations

Sources 

  (for Dillon)
  – Dacre to Dysart
  – (for timeline)
 
  – Viscounts (for Dillon)
  (for 1st Viscount)

1682 deaths
People from County Mayo
Dillon, Lucas Dillon, 6th Viscount